Love Sunset is the first studio album by Bagdad Cafe the Trench Town, released in August 2003. After its release the band was featured as a new artist on Osaka's FM802 radio station.

Track listing

Personnel
The following details are taken from the inlay card of the album. The names of some members are written differently than on subsequent albums. 
 May - vocals
 What's Up Raita - guitar
 Mura - guitar
 Mountain - bass 
 Tico Arai - drums
 Michael Punch - piano 
 Big Mama - chorus 
 Ran - chorus 
 Iwai Long Seller - organ 
 Mr. Soulman - tenor saxophone
 Ume - trombone
  - lyrics

References 

2003 debut albums